Đorđe "Đoko" Rosić (28 February 1932 – 21 February 2014) was a Bulgarian actor who was also well known in Hungary.

Biography
Rosić was born in Krupanj, Kingdom of Yugoslavia (today in western Serbia) to a Serbian father and a Bulgarian mother. At age 19 in 1951, he emigrated to Bulgaria for political reasons. He graduated from what is today the University of National and World Economy in Sofia in 1957. He worked as a Bulgarian National Radio journalist for 17 years, after first being invited to work in radio because of his deep voice. Rosić shot his first film in 1963. From that time until his death in 2014 he appeared in over 110 movies, mostly Bulgarian productions, but also a large number of Hungarian films.
He was married two times. First wife - Zanka Alexandrova. Second wife Liliana Lazarova. His only child is the Bulgarian drama actress Irina Rosic, but he also had a step son from his second wife's first marriage - Stoyan Kolev. Rosic has two grandsons - Valentin Hristov, George Sabev and two step granddaughters Maria Koleva, Plamena Koleva. He also has one great-grandson Branimir Hristov (Branko) and a great granddaughter Jovana Hristova.

Rosić died on 21 February 2014 from complications after brain tumor surgery.  He was 81.

Selected filmography

References

External links
 

Bulgarian male film actors
Serbian emigrants to Bulgaria
1932 births
2014 deaths
Serbian male film actors
People from Krupanj
Yugoslav emigrants to Bulgaria
Serbian people of Bulgarian descent
Bulgarian people of Serbian descent